Love Letters from Elvis is the fourteenth studio album by American singer and musician Elvis Presley, released in 1971. The album was critically panned upon release, and failed to crack the top 20 of the Billboard album charts but did reach No. 12 on the US Top Country Albums chart and No. 7 on the UK best-selling albums chart.

Content
The album was made up of leftovers from Elvis' marathon June 1970 recording sessions in Nashville. Most of the other 35 songs recorded during those sessions had been used in Elvis' 1970 albums That's the Way It Is and Elvis Country (I'm 10,000 Years Old). Wanting to squeeze out a third album from the sessions, RCA records had producer Felton Jarvis mix, overdub and compile the remaining songs.

The song's title track was a rare instance of Presley re-recording a past hit in the studio, his original version of "Love Letters" having been released as a single in 1966. "Got My Mojo Working" is edited down from an impromptu jam session; Presley's version incorporates lyrics from "Hands Off", a 1955 song by Frankie Castro released on the Wing record label (RCA often mislabelled this song "Keep Your Hands Off of It" when the complete jam was issued on CD years later).

Three songs from this album were released on singles. The single "Life" / "Only Believe" was released in March 1971 and reached only No. 53 on the US Billboard Singles chart. It was Elvis's lowest chart position for a single since "Almost in Love" had reached No. 95 in late 1968. "Heart of Rome" was placed on the B-side of the non-album track "I'm Leavin'" released as a single in August 1971 it reached No. 23 in the UK and No. 83 in Australia.

Track listing

Original release

Follow That Dream reissue

Personnel
Elvis Presley - lead vocals, acoustic rhythm guitar
James Burton - lead guitar
Chip Young - rhythm guitar
Charlie Hodge – harmony vocals on “Heart of Rome” and “This Is Our Dance”, acoustic rhythm guitar
Norbert Putnam - bass
David Briggs - piano
Jerry Carrigan - drums
 Charlie McCoy – harmonica, vibraphone, organ
The Imperials Quartet – backing vocals
The Jordanaires – backing vocals on "When I'm Over You"
The Nashville Edition – backing vocals on "It Ain't No Big Thing (But It's Growing)"

References

External links

Elvis Presley albums
1971 albums
Albums produced by Felton Jarvis
RCA Records albums